Expanding Senses is the third album from melodic death metal band Darkane.

It was released on 26 August 2002 in Europe, 4 September 2002 in Japan by Toy's Factory & 1 October 2002 in United States.

This the only Darkane Album not to have the band's Logo on the cover.

Track listing
"Innocence Gone" (Ideberg) – 4:43
"Solitary Confinement" (Malmström, Wildoer) – 5:02
"Fatal Impact" (Malmström, Wildoer) – 3:41
"Imaginary Entity" (Malmström, Wildoer) – 4:45
"Violence from Within" (Malmström, Wildoer) – 5:11
"The Fear of One's Self" (Ideberg, Malmström) – 2:42
"Chaos vs. Order" (Malmström, Wildoer) – 4:47
"Parasites of the Unexplained" (Malmström, Wildoer) – 3:54
"Submission" (Malmström, Wildoer) – 5:34
"Growing Hate" (Japanese Bonus Track) – 3:55

Credits
Darkane
Andreas Sydow - Vocals
Klas Ideberg - Guitar
Christofer Malmström - Guitar, Arranger
Jörgen Löfberg - Bass
Peter Wildoer - Drums, Mixing, Tabla

Guests
Örjan Örnkloo - Sampling, Mixing, Keyboard Programming
Daniel Bergstrand - Mixing
Andy Siry - A&R
Lawrence Mackrory - Additional vocals on "Chaos Vs. Order"
Thomas Ewerhard - Artwork, Cover Art
Thomas Eberger - Mastering
Johan Larsson - Choir, Chorus, Model
Lotta Alm - Choir, Chorus
Mattias Svensson - Choir, Chorus

References

2002 albums
Darkane albums
Nuclear Blast albums